Garmab is a city in Zanjan Province, Iran.

Garmab or Garm Ab may also refer to other places in Iran:
 Garmab, Alborz
 Garmab Dasht, Gilan Province
 Garm Ab Sara, Gilan Province
 Garmab, alternate name of Garmeh, Isfahan, Isfahan Province
 Garmab, Kerman
 Garmab, Kermanshah
 Garmab, Khuzestan
 Garm Ab, Kohgiluyeh and Boyer-Ahmad
 Garmab, Baneh, Kurdistan Province
 Garmab, Kamyaran, Kurdistan Province
 Garmab, Markazi
 Garmab, Faruj, North Khorasan Province
 Garmab, Maneh and Samalqan, North Khorasan Province
 Garmab, Shirvan, North Khorasan Province
 Garmab, Firuzeh, Razavi Khorasan Province
 Garmab, Torbat-e Heydarieh, Razavi Khorasan Province
 Garmab-e Shahzadeh, Razavi Khorasan Province
 Garmab-e Bala, Semnan Province
 Garmab-e Pain, Semnan Province
 Garmab, South Khorasan
 Garmab-e Olya, West Azerbaijan Province
 Garmab Rural District, in Mazandaran Province

See also
 Garm Ab, Afghanistan